Kris Fillat (Buchanan) (born November 7, 1970, in San Diego, California) is a former field hockey player from the United States, who made her international senior debut for the Women's National Team in 1990. She was a member of the team that finished fifth at the 1996 Summer Olympics in Atlanta, Georgia.  She won a bronze medal at the 1995 Pan American Games.

Life
She was a student at the University of Iowa, where she played for the Hawkeyes, as a forward.

She is the founder of the brand GoodOnYa which  includes GoodOnYa deli, GoodOnYa bar and GoodOnYa hydrate.

International senior tournaments
 1990 – World Cup, Sydney, Australia (12th)
 1991 – Pan American Games, Havana, Cuba (3rd)
 1994 – World Cup, Dublin, Ireland (3rd)
 1995 – Pan American Games, Mar del Plata, Argentina (2nd)
 1995 – Champions Trophy, Mar del Plata, Argentina (3rd)
 1996 – Summer Olympics, Atlanta, United States (5th)
 1998 – World Cup, Utrecht, The Netherlands (8th)
 1999 – Pan American Games, Winnipeg, Canada (2nd)
 2000 – Olympic Qualifying Tournament, Milton Keynes, England (6th)

References

External links
 
 Profile on U.S. Field Hockey

1970 births
Living people
American female field hockey players
Olympic field hockey players of the United States
Sportspeople from San Diego
Field hockey players at the 1996 Summer Olympics
Iowa Hawkeyes field hockey players
Pan American Games silver medalists for the United States
Pan American Games bronze medalists for the United States
Pan American Games medalists in field hockey
Field hockey players at the 1991 Pan American Games
Field hockey players at the 1995 Pan American Games
Field hockey players at the 1999 Pan American Games
Medalists at the 1991 Pan American Games
Medalists at the 1995 Pan American Games
Medalists at the 1999 Pan American Games